Dries Wouters (born 28 January 1997) is a Belgian professional footballer who plays as a centre-back or defensive midfielder for Belgian First Division A club Mechelen, on loan from Schalke 04.

Career 
Wouters played with Genk as a junior. He made his Belgian Pro League debut with K.R.C. Genk on 10 May 2015 against SV Zulte Waregem.

He signed for Schalke 04, newly relegated to the 2. Bundesliga, in July 2021. On 12 January 2022, Wouters returned to Belgium to join Mechelen on loan until the end of the season. On 20 June 2022, the loan was extended.

Career statistics

Honours
Genk
Belgian First Division A: 2018–19
Belgian Cup: 2020–21
Belgian Super Cup: 2019

References

External links

1997 births
Living people
Belgian footballers
Association football defenders
Belgium under-21 international footballers
Belgium youth international footballers
Belgian Pro League players
2. Bundesliga players
K.R.C. Genk players
FC Schalke 04 players
K.V. Mechelen players
Belgian expatriate footballers
Belgian expatriate sportspeople in Germany
Expatriate footballers in Germany
People from Tongeren
Footballers from Limburg (Belgium)